Welcome Msomi (1943 in Durban - July 2020) was a South African playwright, actor, and writer best known for the play uMabatha, which was an adaptation of Shakespeare's Macbeth into Zulu culture.

Early life
Msomi wrote his first book at age 15.

Legal problems
In 2019 Msomi was arrested regarding theft and embezzlement of 8 million rands, and pleaded guilty on all 61 charges. His lawyer subsequently argued that he was too ill to serve a prison sentence, noting that Msomi had suffered a stroke and spent time in a diabetic coma.

Death
In 2020, msomi died as a result of illness

Works

Play
uMabatha(1970)

References

South African male stage actors
South African dramatists and playwrights
1943 births
2020 deaths